Howard Brubaker (June 26, 1882 - February 2, 1957) was an American magazine editor and writer.

Brubaker was born in Warsaw, Indiana and attended Indiana University. In 1902 he moved to New York, where he lived at the University Settlement House for several years before becoming an associate editor for Success from 1907 to 1911. He went on to become an editor for Collier's Weekly (1914–19) and The Liberator (1918-24) as well as a contributor to many other magazines including The New Yorker, The Saturday Evening Post, Life, The New Republic and Country Gentleman. He published over 100 short stories and a number of non-fiction pieces on contemporary affairs, especially national politics, in which he tended to espouse a left-of-center viewpoint.  He is best known for "Of All Things", a by-liner column that ran weekly in the New Yorker from 1925 to 1951. This column was composed of a series of brief paragraphs that offered humorous and satirical comments on contemporary happenings and personages. Many of these witticisms were reprinted in newspapers across the country. Brubaker died at his home in Greens Farms, Connecticut, at the age of 74.

Bibliography

References

The New Yorker people
1882 births
1957 deaths
American magazine editors
People from Indiana